Bautzen or Budyšin, until 1868 Budissin, is a town in eastern Saxony, Germany, and the administrative centre of the district of Bautzen. It is located on the Spree river, is the eighth most populous town in Saxony, and is the seat of Saxony's largest district. Bautzen lies in the bilingual Sorbian settlement area (Serbski sydlenski rum) of  Lusatia, and is Lusatia's third-largest town after Cottbus and Görlitz, as well as the second-largest town in Upper Lusatia.

The town lies in the hilly Upper Lusatian Gefilde (Hornjołužiske hona), a part of the northwesternmost foothills of the Sudetes, just north of the Lusatian Highlands. Bautzen is the first larger town on the Spree River, and the Bautzen Reservoir (Budyska rěčna zawěra) lies in the north of the town. In 2021, Bautzen had a population of around 38,000.

Although Görlitz is larger, it is Bautzen that is regarded as the historical capital of Upper Lusatia. Bautzen is the political and cultural center of the entirety of the Slavic minority of the Sorbs (Upper and Lower), although Lower Lusatia and the Lower Sorbian-speaking Sorbs have an own, second center, which is Cottbus. About 10 percent of Bautzen's population is Upper Sorbian-speaking. The use of the language is more widespread in the countryside surrounding the town than in the town itself. Bautzen is the seat of several Sorbian institutions like the Domowina, the German-Sorbian People's Theater (Němsko-Serbske ludowe dźiwadło), and Sorbian Broadcasting (Sorbischer Rundfunk, Serbski rozhłós).

From 1346 until 1815, the town was a member of the Lusatian League. The Bautzen Wenceslaus' Market (Bautzener Wenzelsmarkt, Upper Sorbian: Budyske Wjacławske wiki) is Germany's "oldest christmas market mentioned in a chronicle". Asteroid 11580 Bautzen is named in honour of the city.

Names
Like other cities and places in Lusatia, Bautzen has several different names across languages. Its German name was also officially changed in 1868.

Besides Bautzen (German) and Budyšin (Upper Sorbian), the town has had the following names:

 German: Budissin (variants used from c. 11th century onwards; Saxon government changed to Bautzen on 3 June 1868)
 Lower Sorbian: Budyšyn

Geography

Geographical situation
To the north stretches the Bautzen Reservoir, which was flooded in 1974. This is the former location of the villages of Malsitz (Małšecy) and Nimschütz (Hněwsecy).

Expansion of the urban area
The old part of Bautzen is located on the plateau above the Spree, whose top is marked by the Ortenburg (de) castle. It is bordered by the city walls. The later-built more recent quarters in the east were enclosed by the city ramparts. After their removal, the city expanded further east and to the left bank of the river. However, there has only been a small urban area west of the Spree until today. In the 1970s, the development areas of "Gesundbrunnen" and "Allendeviertel" were erected. After 1990, several neighbouring villages were incorporated.

Bordering municipalities
The city is bordered by Radibor, Großdubrau and Malschwitz in the North, Kubschütz in the East, Großpostwitz, Obergurig and Doberschau-Gaußig in the South, as well as Göda in the West. All of these belong to the Bautzen district.

Subdivisions
The 15 city districts are:

History

In the 3rd century AD an eastern Germanic settlement existed here, but excavations have proved that the region was already inhabited as early as the late Stone Age. Sorbs arrived in the area during the migration period in the 6th century AD.

The first written evidence of the city is from 1002 under the name Budusin. In 1018 the Peace of Bautzen was signed between the German king Henry II and the Polish ruler Bolesław I the Brave. The treaty left the town under Polish rule. In 1032 it passed to the Margraviate of Meissen within the Holy Roman Empire, in 1075 to the Duchy of Bohemia, elevated to a kingdom in 1198 (with short periods of Brandenburgian and Hungarian rule), in 1635 to Saxony, whose electors were also Polish kings in personal union from 1697 to 1763. One of two main routes connecting Warsaw and Dresden ran through the town at that time.

From 1346 to 1815, it was a member of the Six Cities' Alliance of the Upper Lusatian cities of Görlitz, Zittau, Löbau, Kamenz, Lauban, and Bautzen.

In 1429 and 1431 the town was unsuccessfully besieged by the Hussites. In 1634, it was destroyed by the Swedes during the Thirty Years' War. It was the site of one of the battlefields of the Napoleonic War Battle of Bautzen in 1813. In 1868, the name was officially changed from Budissin to the more Germanized form Bautzen.

In 1839, the Sorbian student organization  was founded in the city. In 1845, the Sorbian national anthem was publicly performed for the first time in the city. The Sorbian House, a Sorbian cultural centre, was opened in the city in 1904.

After the Nazi Party came to power in Germany in 1933, many political prisoners were held in the Bautzen I and Bautzen II prisons, built in 1904 and 1906, respectively. During the Kristallnacht in 1938, local Jews were persecuted and Jewish-owned businesses were destroyed. During World War II, the AL Bautzen subcamp of the Groß-Rosen concentration camp operated in Bautzen. At least 600 men, mostly Poles, but also of other nationalities, were imprisoned there, about 310 of whom died. Ernst Thälmann was imprisoned there before being deported to Buchenwald. In April 1945, the Germans evacuated many prisoners on foot to Nixdorf, where they were liberated by Polish troops on May 8, 1945, while the remaining prisoners were liberated in Bautzen by the Soviets on April 20, 1945. Between 21 April and 30 April 1945, the Battle of Bautzen was fought which resulted in the town being recaptured by the German army. This meant Bautzen and its surroundings stayed in German hands until Germany's capitulation.

From 1952 to 1990, Bautzen was part of the Bezirk Dresden of East Germany. Bautzen was infamous throughout East Germany for its two penitentiaries. "Bautzen I" was used as an official prison, soon to be nicknamed  ("Yellow Misery") due to its outer colour, whereas the more secretive "Bautzen II" was used as a facility to hold political prisoners, dissidents and prisoners of conscience. Today, Bautzen I is known as the Bautzen Correctional Institution and is used to hold prisoners who are awaiting trial. Bautzen II which was also operated by the GDR's Ministry for State Security, has served as an open memorial since 1993, operated by the Saxon Memorials Foundation. It is accessible to the public. Guided tours are provided and occasionally, films are screened. A permanent exhibition depicts the misery suffered by occupants; visitors may tour detention cells, the isolation area and the yards where prisoners were allowed to exercise.

In 2002 the city commemorated its 1000th birthday. In 2010 it was hit by a flood.

Population development 

(as of December 31 unless otherwise stated)

 1849 – 10,518
 1868 – 12,623
 1875 – 14,709
 1890 – 21,516
 1933 – 41,951
 1950 – 41,592 (as of August 31)
 1960 – 41,613
 1984 – 51,208
 1995 – 44,763
 2000 – 43,353
 2005 – 42,150
 2010 – 40,573
 2015 – 40,501

Politics
The Bautzen City Council consists of 34 members. There are also four local councils (Niederkaina, Stiebitz, Kleinwelka, and Salzenforst-Bolbritz), whose honorary members are elected for five years.

Mayors
Konrad Johannes Kaeubler, Lord Mayor (1890-1918)
Gottfried Franz Hermann Niedner, (1872-1945), Lord Mayor 1918-1933
Christian Schramm (born 1952), (CDU), (Lord) Mayor 1990–2015
Alexander Ahrens (born 1966), (independent), Lord Mayor 2015–2022

Main sights

Bautzen has a very compact and well-preserved medieval town centre with numerous churches and towers and a city wall on the steep embankment to the river Spree, with one of the oldest preserved waterworks in central Europe (built 1558).

Sites of interest include:
The Reichenturm, one of the steepest leaning and still passable towers north of the Alps
Ortenburg Castle
The Old Waterworks, an architectural monument and museum
Saint Peter's Cathedral, Eastern Germany's only historic interdenominational church edifice
Hexenhaus (Witch's House), oldest preserved residential building (built in 1604)

There are six museums in Bautzen, including the Stadtmuseum Bautzen ("Bautzen city Museum"), the Sorbisches Museum ("Sorbian Museum", Sorbian: Serbski muzej) and the Senfmuseum (Mustard Museum).

Sorbian institutions

Bautzen is the seat of several institutions of the cultural self-administration of the Sorbian people:
 Foundation for the Sorbian People (Stiftung für das sorbische Volk, Załožba za serbski lud)
 Domowina (poet. Sorbian for „Homeland“, actually: Zwjazk Łužiskich Serbow z. t., Bund Lausitzer Sorben e. V.) – the umbrella organization of Sorbian cultural associations and institutions
 Sorbian Radio (Serbski rozhłós) 
 Sorbian National Ensemble and the German-Sorbian People's Theater (Němsko-serbske ludowe dźiwadło)
 Bautzen Sorbian Boarding School

Economy

Alstom Transportation operates a large factory on Fabrikstraße making railway locomotives, carriages and trams. It was built by the former VEB Waggonbau Bautzen, which was acquired by Bombardier Transportation in 1998 via Deutsche Waggonbau and acquired by Alstom when Bombardier Transportation was sold by parent Bombardier Inc. in 2021.

The mustard Bautz'ner Senf is produced in Bautzen. It is the market leader in the new states of Germany with a market share of 65 percent.

Notable people 

 Walter von Boetticher (1853–1945), historian and physician
 Karl Gustav Brescius (1824–1864), railway engineer
 Rudolf Buchheim (1820–1879), German pharmacologist
 Wilhelm Buck (1869–1945), Prime Minister of the Free State of Saxony
 Friedrich August Carus (1770–1807), psychologist and philosopher
 Kurt Dinter (1868–1945), botanist and explorer in South West Africa
 Werner von Erdmannsdorff (1891–1945), General of Infantry in World War II
 Will Grohmann (1887–1968), art historian and art critic
 Erhard Heinz (1924–2017), mathematician
 Hermann Hunger (born 1942), Austrian assyriologist
 Hermann Lotze (1817–1881), German philosopher and logician
 August Gottlieb Meißner (1753–1807), writer, founder of the German crime novel
 Harald Metzkes (born 1929), painter and graphic artist
 Juro Mětšk (born 1954), composer
 Ferdinand Neuling (1885–1960), General of Infantry in World War II
 Caspar Peucer (1525–1602), German-Sorbian reformer, physician and scholar
 Charles Gottlieb Raue (1820–1896), American homeopathic physician
 Georg-Hans Reinhardt (1887–1963), Colonel-General of the German Wehrmacht
 Simone Ritscher (born 1959), actress
 Friedrich Wilhelm Ehrenfried Rost (1768–1835), theologian and philosopher
 Hans von Tettau (1888–1956), infantry General
 Hans Unger (1872–1936), painter
 Karl Friedrich Gottlob Wetzel (1779–1819), writer
 Handrij Zejler (1804–1872), born in the district Salzenforst, founder of modern Sorbian poetry

Twin towns – sister cities

Bautzen is twinned with:
 Worms, Germany (1990)
 Heidelberg, Germany (1991)
 Dreux, France (1992)
 Jablonec nad Nisou, Czech Republic (1993)
 Jelenia Góra, Poland (1993)

References

External links

Official website
Interactive sightseeing tour through Bautzen (German)

 
Towns in Saxony
Populated places in Bautzen (district)